Scyphospora is a genus of fungi in the family Apiosporaceae.

Species
 Scyphospora phyllostachydicola
 Scyphospora hysterina

External links
Scyphospora at Mycobank

Sordariomycetes